Oxymeris dimidiata, common name : the orange auger, is a species of sea snail, a marine gastropod mollusc in the family Terebridae, the auger snails.

Description
The shell size varies between 55 mm and 165 mm.

Distribution
This species occurs in the Red Sea and in the Indian Ocean off Aldabra, Chagos, Madagascar, the Mascerene Basin, Mauritius, Mozambique, KwaZulu (South Africa) and Tanzania; in the Pacific Ocean from Papua New Guinea to Hawaii.

References

 Bratcher T. & Cernohorsky W.O. (1987). Living terebras of the world. A monograph of the recent Terebridae of the world. American Malacologists, Melbourne, Florida & Burlington, Massachusetts. 240pp

External links
 
 Linnaeus, C. (1758). Systema Naturae per regna tria naturae, secundum classes, ordines, genera, species, cum characteribus, differentiis, synonymis, locis. Editio decima, reformata [10th revised edition, vol. 1: 824 pp. Laurentius Salvius: Holmiae]
 Deshayes, G. P. (1857). Description d'espèces nouvelles du genre Terebra. Journal de Conchyliologie. 6 (1): 65-102
 Fedosov, A. E.; Malcolm, G.; Terryn, Y.; Gorson, J.; Modica, M. V.; Holford, M.; Puillandre, N. (2020). Phylogenetic classification of the family Terebridae (Neogastropoda: Conoidea). Journal of Molluscan Studies. 85(4): 359-388

Terebridae
Gastropods described in 1758
Taxa named by Carl Linnaeus